Yulex Corporation makes products from Guayule (Parthenium argentatum) a residual agricultural material.

Commercial success 
In 2008, the U.S. Food and Drug Administration (FDA) approved Yulex biorubber gloves for medical uses. Yulex is the first company to produce biobased, medical-grade latex that is safe for people with latex allergy.

In 2012, Yulex received a $6.9 million USDA-DoE grant as part of a research consortium. Partnering with the Agricultural Research Service (ARS) and Cooper Tire, Yulex will research enhanced manufacturing processes, testing and utilization of guayule natural rubber as a strategic source of raw material in tires, and evaluate the remaining biomass of the guayule plant as a source of bio-fuel for the transportation industry, as well work on improving agronomic practices, developing genetic information and undertaking a lifecycle analysis.

Also in 2012, Yulex released the first alternative to the traditional neoprene wetsuit in partnership with Patagonia, the first guayule-based mattresses and pillows in partnership with Pure LatexBliss, and the first plant-based, latex allergy-friendly dental dam in partnership with 4D Rubber.

In 2013, Yulex formed a partnership with ENI's Versalis to expand the reach of guayule into European markets.

See also 
Parthenium argentatum
Rubber

References

External links

Official website

Companies established in 2000
Companies based in Arizona